Deoclona is a moth genus. It is placed in the family Autostichidae.

Species
 Deoclona complanata (Meyrick, 1922)
 Deoclona eriobotryae (Busck, 1939)
 Deoclona xanthoselene (Walsingham, 1911)
 Deoclona yuccasella Busck, 1903

References

Deocloninae